Moulsoe is a village and civil parish in the unitary authority area of the City of Milton Keynes, Buckinghamshire, England. It is on the border with Bedfordshire, and just east of the M1, situated about  ESE of Newport Pagnell, and about  NNE of Central Milton Keynes.  The main road through the village is the Newport Road coming from the west, changing to the Cranfield Road going east at a bend by the church.

The village name is an Old English language word which means 'Mul's hill spur'.  In the Domesday Book of 1086 the village was recorded as Moleshou.

At the 2011 Census, the population of the parish was 318, down slightly from 330 at the 2001 census. , the parish is mainly rural but a large area just west of the village has been identified for future expansion of Milton Keynes.

There are several old thatched dwellings. Other buildings are of brick apart from some concrete council houses to the west and the church which is of stone, and dates from the 12th century.  There is an inn, the Carrington Arms, and a village hall, the Millennium Hall.

Caldecote

Caldecote is a tiny hamlet in the parish, notable because of it being mentioned in Domesday.

Gallery

References

External links

Villages in Buckinghamshire
Areas of Milton Keynes
Civil parishes in Buckinghamshire